Hyalurga fenestrata is a moth of the family Erebidae. It was described by Francis Walker in 1855. It is found in Brazil and Paraguay.

References

Hyalurga
Moths described in 1855